Kewal Singh Choudhary (1915–1991) was an Indian diplomat, Foreign Secretary and India's ambassador to the USSR, Indian High Commissioner to Pakistan and USA. He was a 1955 recipient of the Indian civilian honour of Padma Shri.

Early life and education 
Kewal Singh was born into  a Sikh family in the Lyallpur District of West Punjab on June 1, 1915. He was educated at the Forman Christian College, Lahore, the Law College, Lahore and at the Balliol College of Oxford University. He joined the Indian Civil Service in 1939 and served in Punjab in administrative positions until Independence after which he opted for the Indian Foreign Service. Between 1944 and 1946 he served as Colonization Officer, Nilibar. Then he served as district magistrate at Shahpur and Simla for the years 1946-47 and 1947-48 respectively.

Diplomatic career 
Kewal Singh served as First secretary of Indian Embassy in Turkey between 1948 and 1949. Then served in Indian military mission, Berlin during 1949–51. Later, he was appointed Indian Consul-General to French Indian enclaves in October 1953 succeeding R. K. Tandon and stayed in that position until the French ceded them to India in 1954. He also played prominent role in their integration into the Indian union. In the same year he became the Chief Commissioner of the State of Pondicherry and served until November 1956. He later served at Indian missions in Stockholm, London and in Germany.

Kewal Singh was India's Ambassador to Portugal in 1962 when India's annexation of Goa led to diplomatic relations between Lisbon and New Delhi being severed, while as High Commissioner to Pakistan in 1965, he similarly had to leave that country after the breaking off of diplomatic relations following the Indo-Pak War of 1965.

He served as India's ambassador to the USSR from 1966 to 1968, and as Ambassador to the United States from 1976 to 1977. He succeeded T. N. Kaul as foreign secretary, serving from November 1972 to October 1976. India took over Sikkim, its protectorate, following prolonged internal disturbances there while Singh was foreign secretary. During his tenure, India signed an agreement for demarcating the maritime boundary with Sri Lanka and led a series of talks with the then Pakistani Foreign Secretary Agha Shahi on normalising communications and travel between the two countries.

Death and legacy 

Following his retirement as the ambassador to USA, Kewal Singh taught at the UCLA and at Kentucky University's Patterson School of Diplomacy and International Commerce where he was distinguished world statesman in residence until his death in 1991.He is survived by two children Mohinder and Gita. He authored a book, Partition and Aftermath: Memoirs of an Ambassador.

Offices held

See also 
 List of lieutenant governors of Puducherry
 List of consuls general of India in the French India
 List of ambassadors of India to Russia
 List of ambassadors of India to the United States
 List of Padma Shri award recipients (1954–1959)

References

Notes

1915 births
1991 deaths
Ambassadors of India to the Soviet Union
Ambassadors of India to the United States
Ambassadors of India to Germany
Ambassadors of India to Mongolia
Ambassadors of India to Sweden
Ambassadors of India to Denmark
High Commissioners of India to Pakistan
Alumni of the University of Oxford
Indian civil servants
Indian Foreign Service officers
Forman Christian College alumni
Indian Foreign Secretaries
People from Faisalabad
Punjabi people
Recipients of the Padma Shri in civil service
Lieutenant Governors of Puducherry